Bride is an American Christian metal band formed in the 1980s, by brothers Dale and Troy Thompson. During the band's peak years it was known for covering a wide range of musical styles and remains popular in places like Brazil. Their song "Same 'Ol Sinner" is on the Digital Praise PC game Guitar Praise.

Band history
Bride was formed in Louisville, Kentucky in the early 1980s, by brothers Dale and Troy Thompson. Going by the name Matrix at first, the brothers started writing music and recording demos in 1983. They recorded four demos and started selling them at concerts and through magazines. In 1986, the band opened for the Canadian group Daniel Band in Pottstown, Pennsylvania. This performance caught the eye of an agent of Refuge Records. He decided to sign them to their new label, Pure Metal Records, which was oriented to metal music. At that time, the band consisted of guitarist Steve Osborne (1966–2011), bassist Scott Hall, and drummer Stephen Rolland. They officially changed its name to Bride and went on to record Show No Mercy. In 1988, bassist Frank Partipilo joined the band and with this line up they recorded Live to Die and Silence Is Madness (1989).

With their contract with Pure Metal Records about to end, the band released End of the Age in 1990, which is a compilation album of hits from their first three albums, as well as two new songs that would go to become Bride staples - Everybody Knows My Name and Same Ol' Sinner. The album signaled the "end of an age" as the band shifted away from the heavy metal of their past towards a Guns N' Roses' influenced hard rock sound.

In 1991, Rick Foley (bass) and Jerry McBroom (drums) joined the band. With a new record deal with Star Song Records, the band released Kinetic Faith. The album spawned some hits in commercial radio. In 1992, it was announced that Dale would leave to join Stryper to replace Michael Sweet, but this never took place. They followed Kinetic Faith with Snakes in the Playground and Scarecrow Messiah (1994) before releasing yet another compilation, Shotgun Wedding: 11 No. 1 Hits and Mrs., and finally parting ways with Starsong in 1995. All three albums produced many successful hits in Brazil, where the band has toured and been received with enormous crowds and fanbase.

That same year, the band signed a one-record deal with a new label called Rugged Records. They also welcomed a new bassist, Steve Curtsinger. Drop (1995) featured banjo and mandolin. In 1997, they released The Jesus Experience which continued their alternative style leanings, however, with a slight grunge and post-grunge overtone. The next year, they released Oddities. Although intended to be a return to their roots, the album was more of a blend between alternative rock and hard rock.

After some differences with the label, the band asked to be released from its contract. Some time later, Curtsinger and was replaced with Andrew Wilkinson before Lawrence Bishop took the spot, McBroom also left and was replaced with Michael Loy. Being picked up by Absolute Records and veering into rapcore territory, the band released Fist Full of Bees in 2001. The album was quickly disparaged by fans for containing nu metal and rapcore elements.

In 2003, the band independently released This Is It. It was re-released in 2006 under Retrospective Records, digitally remastered and with bonus tracks and a new cover.

In 2006, Bride released Skin for Skin, with guitar solos from former Bride guitarist Steve Osborne. The album was praised by Scott Waters of Ultimatum, who said it was "a logical step from 'This Is It' and is an honest and successful attempt to progress without worry of what is popular."

The band reunited with former members, Jerry McBroom and Steve Osborne, to record their next album, Tsar Bomba, which was released on October 27, 2009.

In 2011, Retroactive Records remastered and re-released the band's first three albums (Show No Mercy, Live to Die, Silence Is Madness) in a series called "The Originals". In addition, 2003's This Is It was also remastered to support the re-releases.

Original guitarist Steve Osborne died of suicide on November 16, 2011.

In December 2013, after 30 years, Dale Thompson announced that the band was coming to an end.

The band released "Here is Your God" on Retroactive Records in November 2020 while announcing a new album of the same name, for release on CD on December 15, 2020 and on vinyl on March 10, 2021.

Band members

Current line-up
 Dale Thompson – vocals
 Troy Thompson – guitars
 Nenel Lucena – bass guitar
 Alexandre Aposan – drums

Former
 Steve Osborne – guitar (1986–1988, 2006, 2009)
 Scott Hall – bass guitar (1986–1988)
 Rick Foley – bass guitar (1991–1994)
 Steve Curtsinger – bass guitar (1995–1998,1999)
 Stephen Rolland – drums (1986–1990)
 Frank Partipillo – bass guitar (1988–1991)
 Andrew Wilkinson – bass guitar (1998–1999)
 Michael Loy – drums (1999–2009)
 Lawrence Bishop – bass guitar (1999–2009)
 G.D Watts – bass guitar (2009–2013)
 Jerry McBroom – drums (1991–1999, 2009–2013)

Timeline

Discography
Main studio albums
Show No Mercy (1986, Pure Metal)
Live to Die (1988, Pure Metal)
Silence Is Madness (1989, Pure Metal)
Kinetic Faith (1991 Star Song)
Snakes in the Playground (1992, Star Song)
Scarecrow Messiah (1994, Star Song)
Drop (1995, Rugged Records)
The Jesus Experience (September 16, 1997, Organic)
Oddities (November 23, 1998, Organic, Reviews: HM Magazine)
Fist Full of Bees (2001, Absolute Records)
This is It (2003, independent)
Skin for Skin (2006, Retroactive Records)
Tsar Bomba (2009, Retroactive Records)
Incorruptible (2013, Retroactive Records)
Snake Eyes (2018, independent)
Here is Your God (2020, Retroactive Records)
Bluegrass Gospel (2021, independent)
Christmas (2021, independent)

Compilations and other releases
End of the Age (1990, Star Song)
Snakes in the Playground Special Collector's Edition (1992, Star Song)
God Gave Rock 'n' Roll to You (1993, Star Song)
Shotgun Wedding: 11 No. 1 Hits and Mrs. (1995, Star Song)
Lost Reels I (1994, independent)
Lost Reels II (1994, independent)
I Predict a Clone - various artists (1994 REX 41004-2, a tribute to Steve Taylor)
Lost Reels III (1997, independent)
Bride Live! Volume I (1999, Old School Records)
Bride Live Volume II Acoustic (2000, Millennium Eight Records)
Best of Bride (June 27, 2000, Organic Records)
Live at Cornerstone 2001 (2001, Millennium Eight Records)
The Matrix Years / Lost Reels (2001, Millennium Eight Records)
MP3 Major Releases (2001, independent)
MP3 Independent Releases (2001, independent)
The Organic Years (2002, Millennium Eight Records)
Raw (2003, independent 7-track demo)
This Is It (2006, Retroactive Records with bonus tracks)

Awards
Bride has received four Dove Awards from the Gospel Music Association. Three were for "Hard Music Song", in 1992, 1993, and 1994. The fourth was at the 25th GMA Dove Awards in 1995, for "Hard Music Album" for Scarecrow Messiah.

See also
List of Christian metal artists
List of glam metal bands and artists

References

Further reading

External links
 
 
 

American Christian metal musical groups
American glam metal musical groups
American hard rock musical groups
Christian rock groups from Kentucky
Heavy metal musical groups from Kentucky
Musical groups established in 1983
Musical groups from Louisville, Kentucky
Musical quartets
1983 establishments in Kentucky
2013 disestablishments in Kentucky